The Delphic maxims are a set of pithy moral precepts that were inscribed on the Temple of Apollo in the ancient Greek precinct of Delphi. The three best known maxims – "Know thyself", "Nothing too much", and "Give a pledge and trouble is at hand" – were prominently located at the entrance to the temple, and were traditionally said to have been authored by the legendary Seven Sages of Greece, or even by Apollo. In fact, they are more likely to have simply been popular proverbs. Each maxim has a long history of interpretation, although the third of the set has received comparatively little attention.  

A further 147 maxims, documented by Stobaeus in the 5th century AD, were also located somewhere in the vicinity of the temple. The antiquity and authenticity of these maxims was once in doubt, but recent archaeological discoveries have confirmed that some of the sayings quoted by Stobaeus were current as early as the 3rd century BC.

Entrance maxims
Three maxims are known to have been inscribed on the Temple of Apollo at Delphi at least as early as the 5th century BC, and possibly earlier. These inscriptions are routinely referenced and discussed by ancient authors; Plato, for example, mentions them in six of his dialogues. Their exact location is uncertain; they are variously stated to have been on the wall of the pronaos (forecourt), on a column, on a doorpost, on the temple front, or on the propylaea (gateway).

Although the temple was destroyed and rebuilt several times over the years, the maxims appear to have persisted into the Roman era (1st century AD), at which time, according to Pliny the Elder, they were written in letters of gold. 

The maxims are as follows:

These sayings were traditionally said to have originated with the Seven Sages, a legendary group of philosophers and statesmen who flourished in the 6th century BC. The first known reference to the Seven Sages is in Plato's Protagoras, where they are said to have collectively authored the first two maxims. The names of the sages are given by Plato as Thales, Pittacus, Bias, Solon, Cleobulus, Myson and Chilon; but in the works of later writers, some of these names are dropped and others added in their place. Each of the maxims was often attributed to a particular sage, and some authors, such as Demetrius of Phalerum, assigned additional sayings to the four remaining sages. There was no general agreement over which maxim belonged to which sage, but "Know thyself" was most commonly attributed to Chilon.

Another popular theory held that the maxims were first spoken by the Delphic oracle, and therefore represented the wisdom of the god Apollo. Clearchus of Soli, among others, attempted to reconcile the two accounts by claiming that Chilon, enquiring of the oracle what was best to be learnt, received the answer "Know thyself", and subsequently adopted the maxim as his own. In all likelihood, however, the sayings were simply common proverbs of much earlier date, which gained a new significance from their prominent position on the temple.

First maxim

The first maxim, "Know thyself", has been called "by far the most significant of the three maxims, both in ancient and modern times". In its earliest appearances in ancient literature, it was interpreted to mean that one should understand one's limitations and know one's place in the social scale. The first application of the phrase to self-knowledge in the modern sense occurs in Plato's Phaedrus, in which Socrates says that he has no leisure to investigate the truth behind common mythological beliefs while he has not yet discovered the truth about his own nature.

Second maxim
In ancient Greece, the maxim "Nothing too much" was only rarely understood to mean that one should place limits on one's physical appetites, being far more commonly invoked as a reminder to avoid excessive emotion, particularly excessive grief. It was also quoted by ancient authors as a warning against pride, and considering its placement at the entrance to the temple, it may have been intended to convey that "man is not to exalt himself even in his piety"; in other words, that one should not make lavish sacrifices to the gods, but should humbly give what one can spare.

The maxim has been said to have received its "ultimate expression" in Aristotle's theory of ethics, according to which every classical virtue occupies a middle place between the two extremes of excess and deficiency. It is uncertain, however, whether the maxim was a direct influence on Aristotle, as it is not explicitly referenced in his Nicomachean Ethics (although it does occur twice in another of his works, the Rhetoric). Several other phrases of similar import were current among Greek writers, such as "The half is more than the whole" and "Due measure is best", both of which are found in Hesiod's Works and Days (c. 700 BC).

Interest in the "Nothing too much" dropped off during the medieval era, but it was frequently cited in the literature of the 16th and 17th centuries (often in its Latin form, Ne quid nimis). From this time onwards, the rule of moderation enjoined by the maxim has been more frequently applied to physical pleasures than to emotional states. In John Milton's Paradise Lost, for example, the archangel Michael advises Adam to "observe the rule of not too much ... in what thou eat'st and drink'st, seeking from thence due nourishment, not gluttonous delight".

Some authors, such as 16th-century humanist Sperone Speroni, have criticized the maxim for its apparent endorsement of mediocrity. Such criticism may be traced back as far as Pindar (5th century BC), who claimed that the philosophers of his day were excessive in their praise of the Delphic saying. Similarly, 20th‑century essayist Paul Elmer More has argued that a too-rigorous adherence to the principle of moderation may have been the downfall of ancient Greek civilization.

Third maxim
The third maxim, "Give a pledge and trouble is at hand", has been variously interpreted. The Greek word , here translated "pledge", can mean either (a) surety given for a loan; (b) a binding oath given during a marriage ceremony; or (c) a strong affirmation of any kind. Accordingly, the maxim may be a warning against any one of these things.

The correct interpretation of the maxim was being debated as early as the 1st century BC, when Diodorus Siculus discussed the question in his Bibliotheca historica. In Plutarch's Septem sapientium convivium, the ambiguity of the phrase is said to have "kept many from marrying, and many from trusting, and some even from speaking". Diogenes Laërtius (3rd century AD) also makes reference to the maxim in his account of the life of Pyrrho, the founder of Pyrrhonism. Exploring the origins of the Pyrrhonean doctrine of philosophical skepticism, Diogenes claims that the Delphic maxims are skeptical in nature, and interprets the third maxim to mean: "Trouble attends him who affirms anything in strong terms and confidently".

Analysing the various appearances of the maxim in Greek literature, Eliza Wilkins finds the opinion of the ancient authors on the meaning of  split between the two rival interpretations of "commit yourself emphatically" and "become surety". Among Latin authors, however, the maxim is universally interpreted in the latter sense, as advice against giving surety.

147 maxims of Stobaeus 
In the 5th-century anthology of Stobaeus, there is a list of a further 147 maxims attributed to the Seven Sages of Greece.

Stobaeus cites a certain Sosiades as his source, but the identity of Sosiades is unknown, and it was once thought that this collection of maxims was of no great antiquity. In 1901, however, a parallel collection was discovered at Miletopolis in modern-day Turkey, inscribed on a stele dating from the 3rd or 4th century BC. The stele is broken in two places; the surviving portion carries a list of 56 maxims which closely correspond to those given by Stobaeus, and it is probable that the original text contained all 147.

Another inscription, discovered in 1966 at Ai-Khanoum in modern-day Afghanistan, presents the final five maxims of Stobaeus, and reports that these maxims were originally found at "holy Pytho", i.e. Delphi. The inscription, dating from the 3rd century BC, reads as follows:

The stone which bears this inscription formed the base of a stele, and a small fragment of the stele itself survives. The legible text on the stele, as reconstructed by Louis Robert, reads "", which corresponds to Stobaeus no. 47 and 48 ("Speak well of everyone; Be a seeker of wisdom"). Robert suggested that the stele and base together bore the full list of 147 maxims, with the final five having been appended to the base due to the stonecutter running out of room. On the evidence of these inscriptions, it is now regarded as certain that the sayings preserved by Stobaeus were once inscribed at Delphi, and that their influence was felt not only in Greece, but throughout the wider Hellenistic world.

See also

 List of oracular statements from Delphi
 Via media

References 
Notes

Citations

External links
 "Delphic Maxims" at Hellenion – alternative English translation of the 147 maxims

Ancient Greek religion
Aphorisms